My Own Way may refer to:

 My Own Way (album), by Jay Sean, 2008
 My Own Way (EP), or the title track, by Evermore, 2003
 "My Own Way" (song), by Duran Duran, 1981
 My Own Way, a 1967 album by Hank Williams, Jr.
 "My Own Way", a 2015 song by Kita Alexander
 "My Own Way", a song by Banghra from the 2007 album La danza del vientre
 "My Own Way", a song by Snoop Dogg from the 2011 album Doggumentary